DYPC (88.7 FM) was a radio station owned and operated by Mandaue Broadcasting Center, the media arm of Mandaue City College. It was an affiliate station of Vimcontu Broadcasting Corporation. The station's studio and transmitter were located at the Mandaue City College - Main Campus, H. Abellana St., Brgy. Basak, Mandaue.

History

2013-2015: Campus station
DYPC started its broadcast on June 16, 2013, on 91.8 MHz as a college station of Mandaue City College, an unrecognized and unaccredited private higher education institution owned by Dr. Paulus Mariea L. Cañete. It was known as Cebu's very first campus-based broadcast station when our intention is to broadcast information that educates the public, especially young people and students from around the world aside from music and news at that time. Recently, the station ended its broadcast in late-2014.

2015-2019: Commercial station
On February 3, 2015, DYPC resumes its broadcast on 91.9 MHz, this time under Mandaue Broadcasting Center. The station started carrying a music and news programming, airing news and talk in the morning and music for the rest of the day. At that time, DYPC carried the tagline as "Way Unay!" (lit. like no other).

On August 26, 2015, the station was closed down by the National Telecommunications Commission (NTC) for allegedly operating without permit. On August 28, 2015, it resumed its broadcast despite the said warning.

On September 19, 2017, DYPC transferred its frequency to 88.7 MHz. At the same time, it became an affiliate member of Vimcontu Broadcasting Corporation, which also owns DYLA in Cebu City. In December 2017, DYPC upgraded its transmitting power to 5,000 watts.

In July 2019, the station went off the air after Mandaue Broadcasting Center agree with the NTC that DYPC is a violation on the part of the MCC to operate its radio station without securing the necessary permit from the said government organization. However, DYPC resurfaced as an online platform via Facebook.

References

DYPC
News and talk radio stations in the Philippines
Radio stations established in 2013
Radio stations disestablished in 2019
Defunct radio stations in the Philippines